Gordon A. Bubolz (September 10, 1905 – October 12, 1990) was a member of the Wisconsin State Senate.

Biography
Born in Seymour, Wisconsin, Bubolz had German ancestry. He graduated from Lawrence University, the Wharton School of the University of Pennsylvania and received his law degree from University of Wisconsin Law School. He also went to the George Washington University Law School and taught accounting at Lawrence University. Bubolz practiced law in Appleton, Wisconsin. He was born Gordon August Bubolz on September 10, 1905 in Outagamie County, Wisconsin. Bubolz died of pneumonia in Appleton, Wisconsin on October 12, 1990.

Bubolz was a Lutheran. His brother, George, was a Lutheran pastor and a candidate for the Michigan House of Representatives in 1964. His great-grandson was Ron Tusler who also served in the Wisconsin Legislature.

Career
Bubolz was a member of the Senate from 1945 to 1953. He was a Republican.

References

1905 births
1990 deaths
American Lutherans
American people of German descent
People from Seymour, Wisconsin
Lawrence University alumni
University of Wisconsin Law School alumni
George Washington University Law School alumni
Wharton School of the University of Pennsylvania alumni
Lawrence University faculty
Wisconsin lawyers
Republican Party Wisconsin state senators
20th-century American lawyers
20th-century American politicians
Deaths from pneumonia in Wisconsin